Susanna Mayr (1600, Augsburg – 1674, Augsburg), was a German Baroque painter.

Biography

According to Joachim von Sandrart she was the daughter of the painter Johann Georg Fischer and the mother of Johann Ulrich Mayr, who was also a painter. Besides drawing and painting, she was also a talented cut-out artist.

See also
 List of German women artists

References

1600 births
1674 deaths
German Baroque painters
Artists from Augsburg
German women painters
17th-century German women artists